Attila Sávolt (born 5 February 1976) is a tennis player from Hungary, who represented his native country at the 2000 Sydney Olympics where he lost to Paradorn Srichaphan in his first match. Starting his professional career in 1995, he peaked the ATP-ranking on May 20, 2002, reaching 68 on the world rankings. Surprisingly he has a 1-0 head to head against Tim Henman after beating the 4th seed 11th ranked in the 2003 Dubai Tennis Championships. He also defeated Jiří Novák in their only ATP Tour match-up at the 2002 Orange Warsaw Open, when the Czech was ranked 5th in the world. He participated in the 2004 Hopman Cup alongside Petra Mandula. He won the Hungarian Championships two times. He was coaching Márton Fucsovics and is currently a sports commentary on Sport 1.

Titles

Singles (6)

Doubles (6)

Lifetime overall against notable players

(Including Challengers)

References

External links
 
 
 

1976 births
Living people
Hopman Cup competitors
Hungarian male tennis players
Hungarian tennis coaches
Tennis players at the 2000 Summer Olympics
Olympic tennis players of Hungary
Tennis players from Budapest